Henri-Antoine Jardon (3 February 1768 in Verviers, Liège (today part of Belgium) – 25 March 1809, São Martin do Campo, Santo Tirso, Portugal) was a French general of brigade. He served in the French Revolutionary Wars and the Napoleonic Wars. As part of the Soult's Corps, he participated in the 2nd French invasion of Portugal in 1809, and was killed at the Battle of Braga.

References

1768 births
1809 deaths
People from Verviers
French generals
French military personnel of the French Revolutionary Wars
French commanders of the Napoleonic Wars
French military personnel killed in the Napoleonic Wars
Names inscribed under the Arc de Triomphe